Taskmaster is a British comedy panel game show created by comedian and musician Alex Horne and presented by both Horne and Greg Davies. In the programme a group of five celebritiesmainly comediansattempt to complete a series of challenges, with Horne acting as umpire in each challenge and Davies, the eponymous "Taskmaster", judging the work and awarding points based on contestants' performances. The concept for the programme was first created by Horne for the Edinburgh Festival Fringe in 2010; he later secured a deal with Dave to adapt it for television with the first episode premiering in 2015. After the ninth series in 2019, the programme was acquired by Channel 4.

Taskmaster proved a success on British television, spawning international versions in Australia, Belgium, Croatia, Denmark, Finland, New Zealand, Norway, Portugal, Quebec, Sweden, Spain and the United States. A British spin-off series, Junior Taskmaster, was announced in March 2023. Additionally, a tie-in board game and two books have been released. During the COVID-19 pandemic, Horne hosted #HomeTasking, a series of tasks for people to film in their own homes; for each task, a montage of attempts was posted on YouTube that featured Davies awarding points to his favourite entries.

History 
Taskmaster was the brainchild of comedian Alex Horne whose idea was inspired by The Crystal Maze, his work for Big Brother, and his envy of his close friend Tim Key winning the Edinburgh Comedy Award in 2009. The original concept of the programme took place over the course of two years. In 2009, 20 comedians including Stuart Goldsmith, Josie Long, Mark Watson, Tim Key, Joe Wilkinson and Mike Wozniak, received monthly tasks by email over the course of a year stipulating a variety of tasks. Horne then presented their efforts as part of a two-hour show titled "The Task Master", at the 2010 Edinburgh Festival Fringe which focused on demonstrating the differing attempts by the contestants before revealing who won based on their performances. Mike Wozniak won the first Taskmaster competition. In 2011, Horne conducted another stage show titled "Taskmaster II", with ten contestants tackling tasks.

Both stage shows proved a success with their audiences, leading Horne to recruit production company Avalon to help produce an adaptation of his concept for television before pitching his idea to several different broadcasters. British television channel Dave took interest in the idea and bought the rights to it, with comedian Greg Davies recruited to help present the programme alongside Horne. However the channel's Deputy Director of Commissioning at the time, Hilary Rosen, was concerned with the structure of the show. Horne assured Rosen that the programme was not like a traditional panel show but "more like a sitcom", to account for the involvement of the same group of contestants who would appear across a series. Another problem with the format of Horne's concept was that shooting a traditional pilot became implausible, despite studio segments having no issues being tested. One plan for the programme was for Davies to use a cane with a golden "T" on the base, but this was later dropped. The pilot premiered on 19September 2014, and proved a success with viewers. After the pilot was aired, a series of six episodes was commissioned though intended to be shown in any order. Rosen later determined the show should be arranged in an order, pointing out that "this was a show you record and transmit in the same order". The first series proved a success that led to additional series being commissioned over the course of five years. The involvement of comedian Frank Skinner as a contestant in the first series, at Horne's request, also helped to entice other comedians to take part in the programme.

In November 2019, rumours arose that Taskmaster was being moved to another channel; Channel4 had secured the rights to the programme, renewing it for six series over the course of three years. In March 2023, Channel4 committed to six more series, airing two series of the programme annually up until at least 2026 (i.e. series 21). Channel4 also announced a spin-off called Junior Taskmaster with contestants aged between 9 and 11, consisting of eight episodes and with new hosts to be revealed later. Junior Taskmaster follows similar children-oriented spin-off programmes on Channel4 such as Junior Bake Off and Teen First Dates.

Format

Taskmaster is a comedic game show, in which a group of five contestants – mainly comedians, but sometimes including other well-known television personalities – compete against each other by completing tasks assigned to them. In each episode, contestants are shown tackling a series of tasks, supervised and sometimes assisted by Horne. Davies then judges each contestant's performance in each task to determine how many points they receive, generally ranking them from one to five points. The contestant with the highest score in each episode wins a collection of prizes submitted by the contestants themselves as one of the tasks; the one with the highest cumulative score at the end of a series wins a trophy.

Tasks given to contestants range from simple physical challenges, such as "eat as much watermelon as you can in one minute", to more complex or artistic tasks. Some tasks may be timed, consist of multiple stages, or both. In some cases, contestants conduct tasks as a team with one or two other contestants; in such cases all members of a team receive the same score. To complete tasks, contestants often have to apply a level of logic, creativity, or lateral thinking in order to achieve the end goal. Contestants can be disqualified and awarded no points for a task if they fail to achieve the task's objective, inadvertently break one of the task's rules, or cheat. Conversely, they can be given bonus points. Occasionally, prank tasks are given to one contestant alone, who is led to believe the others are performing the same task; Davies may award bonus points for these.

Tasks are mostly pre-recorded before an episode's broadcast; the majority are usually conducted in or around the Taskmaster house, a former groundskeepers' cottage located on the outskirts of a golf course in Dukes Meadows, Chiswick. Two tasks are usually conducted during studio segments: an introductory Prize task, in which each contestant supplies an object they possess that conforms to a set theme, all of which will be awarded to the winner of the episode; and a final "Live" task, which the contestants perform onstage in the studio. In the event of a tie in the top score at the end of the episode, either a pre-recorded tiebreaker task between the tied contestants is shown, or a quick live task is performed to determine the winner.

Production 
Tasks are filmed with each contestant separately in a house in Chiswick, London. However, Alex Horne's initial plan was to carry out the tasks in the comedians' houses, saying in an interview: "I didn't realise how impractical that would be both in terms of cost – and their lives." Filming tasks takes roughly one day per contestant per episode, filming around eight tasks a day, with the days of filming spread out across several months. Before the studio filming, contestants are forbidden to discuss their tasks and are not shown any footage from the tasks, so that studio reactions are genuine.

Horne designs the tasks to avoid the need for any specialist equipment, so that "people at home [are] able to do the same things". Initially, they planned to have Horne show the right way to complete the task after showing the contestants' attempts, but this was abandoned as "it supposed there was a right way". He also notes that some tasks in the first series involved the general public, but later series avoided this in order to prevent coming across as a "prank show". Some tasks are vetoed by producers for pragmatic reasons, such as "paint the biggest thing red". Others do not turn out as expected, such as "burst all these bubbles [on a massive roll of bubble wrap] – fastest wins", which had been attempted in three different series but not shown in any of them, as "it always ends with people jumping on it for hours".

When asked why he did not present the show, Horne has said that "that was never the plan [...] My role as sidekick is to be sneaky and you can run it from the sides in a really funny way." Horne and Greg Davies had never worked together before Taskmaster; Davies was chosen "because of his authority", Horne says in an interview. He adds that in the pilot, Davies acted as a "dictator figure cross with everyone", but his tone in the show is more relaxed, as "if someone doesn't do something well we really enjoy it so he can be himself".

The series director for Taskmaster is Andy Devonshire, who was previously series director on The Apprentice and the BBC versions of The Great British Bake Off. Peter Orton was director for three episodes in 2016. Production designer James Dillion is responsible for the studio and filming locations as well as the caravan featured from series four onwards, having been past known for designing the original set for The Crystal Maze. The show's theme music was written and performed by The Horne Section, a jazz band led by Horne.

Cast
In the studio, other than while attempting the live task, the contestants sit on a row of chairs in alphabetical order of forename from left to right.

Key
 Series champion

{|class="wikitable" style="text-align:center;"
|-
!rowspan=2|Series
!colspan=5|Seating
|-
!1st
!2nd
!3rd
!4th
!5th
|-
! 1
| Frank Skinner
|style="background:Gold;"| Josh Widdicombe 
| Roisin Conaty
| Romesh Ranganathan
| Tim Key
|-
! 2
| Doc Brown
| Joe Wilkinson
| Jon Richardson
| style="background:Gold;"|Katherine Ryan 
| Richard Osman
|-
! 3
| Al Murray
| Dave Gorman
| Paul Chowdhry
|style="background:Gold;"| Rob Beckett 
| Sara Pascoe
|-
! 4
| Hugh Dennis
| Joe Lycett
| Lolly Adefope
| Mel Giedroyc
|style="background:Gold;"| Noel Fielding 
|-
! 5
| Aisling Bea
| style="background:Gold;"|Bob Mortimer 
| Mark Watson
| Nish Kumar
| Sally Phillips
|-
! 
| Bob Mortimer
| style="background:gold;"|Josh Widdicombe 
| Katherine Ryan
|Noel Fielding
|Rob Beckett
|-
! 6
| Alice Levine
| Asim Chaudhry
| style="background:Gold;"|Liza Tarbuck 
| Russell Howard
| Tim Vine
|-
! 7
| James Acaster
| Jessica Knappett
| style="background:Gold;"|Kerry Godliman 
| Phil Wang
| Rhod Gilbert
|-
! 8
| Iain Stirling
| Joe Thomas
| style="background:Gold;"|Lou Sanders 
| Paul Sinha
| Sian Gibson
|-
! 9
| David Baddiel
| style="background:Gold;"|Ed Gamble 
| Jo Brand
| Katy Wix
| Rose Matafeo
|-
! 10
| Daisy May Cooper
| Johnny Vegas
| Katherine Parkinson
| Mawaan Rizwan
| style="background:Gold;"|Richard Herring 
|-
! 
| John Hannah
| Krishnan Guru-Murthy
| Nicola Coughlan
| Rylan Clark-Neal
| style="background:Gold;"|Shirley Ballas 
|-
! 11
| Charlotte Ritchie
| Jamali Maddix
| Lee Mack
| Mike Wozniak
|style="background:Gold;"| Sarah Kendall 
|-
! 12
| Alan Davies
| Desiree Burch
| Guz Khan
| style="background:Gold;"| Morgana Robinson 
| Victoria Coren Mitchell
|-
! 
| style="background:Gold;"| Adrian Chiles 
| Claudia Winkleman
| Jonnie Peacock
| Lady Leshurr
| Sayeeda Warsi
|-
! 13
| Ardal O'Hanlon
| Bridget Christie
| Chris Ramsey
| Judi Love
| style="background:Gold;"|Sophie Duker 
|-
! 
| Ed Gamble
| Kerry Godliman
| Liza Tarbuck
| Lou Sanders
|style="background:gold;"| Richard Herring 
|-
! 14
|style="background:gold;"| Dara Ó Briain 
| Fern Brady
| John Kearns
| Munya Chawawa
| Sarah Millican
|-
! 
| Amelia Dimoldenberg
| Carol Vorderman
| Greg James
| style="background:gold;"| Mo Farah 
| Rebecca Lucy Taylor
|-
! 15
| Chris Mason
| 
|
| 
| 
|

Episodes

Franchise

International broadcast
The British show is also broadcast in Belgium, Iceland, Sweden, South Africa, Norway, Finland, Australia, Denmark, New Zealand, Croatia and Portugal. On 26 April 2021 a single episode of the spin-off Challengemaster was live streamed in Belgium. In Australia, SBS Viceland started to air Taskmaster episodes on 27 July 2020. The most recently broadcast series is available on SBS on Demand.

In the United States, The CW acquired series 8 and 9 of Taskmaster for a late-Summer run premiering on 2 August 2020. However, the series opened to extremely low viewership (in comparison to the Canadian import, Fridge Wars, which premiered the same day), and was consequently pulled from the network's schedule on 5 August. The CW added the entirety of Series 8 to its "CW Seed" streaming library on 10 August.

A subscription streaming service, Taskmaster SuperMax+, debuted in March 2022. It allows worldwide access to the British version of Taskmaster, free from ads. It followed the show's cult popularity in America, despite little streaming availability; a U.S. version of Taskmaster and broadcast of the British version on The CW were not successful. Horne stated that adding international versions to the service may occur at a later date.

International versions
International versions of the programme have been made in Belgium (as ) (literally "The Greatest Light", but meaning "The Brightest Bulb"), Sweden (as ) ("Best in Test"), Norway (as Kongen befaler) (literally "The King Commands", Norwegian for Simon Says)  and Spain (as ) ("Said and Done"). In Denmark the programme is titled  ("Grandmaster") and premiered on 25 August 2018. In April 2017, a US version with Reggie Watts as the Taskmaster and Horne as the assistant was announced, made by Avalon, the same production company for the UK version and originally aired on Comedy Central on 27 April 2018. A German version featuring Atze Schröder as the Taskmaster was commissioned by RTL in 2017; two episodes were recorded but not broadcast.

In 2019 it was announced a New Zealand version would be produced, hosted by Jeremy Wells and Paul Williams. Three series have been broadcast in 2020, 2021 and 2022. Finnish network MTV3 aired a local version Suurmestari [Grandmaster] starting on 12 April 2020. An international adaptation, Direktor svemira [Director of the Universe], by Croatian broadcaster RTL, began to air on 24 November 2021. Portugal's RTP1 announced in 2021 that a Portuguese version would start broadcasting in early 2022, hosted by Vasco Palmeirim and Nuno Markl. Network 10's Australian version debuted in February 2023, hosted by Tom Gleeson and Tom Cashman.

Related media

Books 
A tie-in book, Taskmaster — 200 Extraordinary Tasks for Ordinary People, was written by Alex Horne and published by Penguin Random House on 6September 2018.

Task 185 in the book provided the latitude and longitude of a Buckinghamshire park, with instructions to meet there at midday on 14September 2019 for a picnic and Taskmaster tour. The event was attended by around 1,800 people, with Horne himself present to show attendees filming locations from the show.

In September 2019, a paperback edition was published, with 20 new tasks. As well as writing additional tasks, Horne removed the expiration date of 31December 2019 where it appeared, and replaced tasks that had a set completion date.

In September 2021, a new book titled Bring Me The Head Of The Taskmaster — 101 Next-level Tasks (and Clues) that Will Lead One Ordinary Person to Some Extraordinary Taskmaster Treasure was released. It offered readers the chance to win a real-world Taskmaster prize.

Board game 
The board game Taskmaster was released in autumn 2019, initially selling out. It contains 200 task cards, along with secret tasks that individual players must perform, and video tasks featuring Alex Horne.

#HomeTasking 
From March to June 2020, during the COVID-19 pandemic and a period of lockdown in the UK, Alex Horne organised a series of tasks in the style of Taskmaster for the public to perform and record in their own homes. Entries were submitted on Twitter and compilation videos, including scoring of the ten best entries by Greg Davies, were published by the Taskmaster YouTube channel. The first task was "Throw a piece of A4 paper into a bin. Most spectacular throw wins." There were 20 tasks in total.

A new series of Hometasking, started during another lockdown in the UK, began on January 14, 2021, featuring tasks previously performed on the TV show.

Podcasts

On 15 October 2020, an official podcast began. It is hosted by Ed Gamble, the winner of Series 9, who comments on each featured episode with a special guest. Initially it focused on Series 10, with each podcast released immediately after each Taskmaster episode was broadcast. Episode 12 of the podcast focused on the 2021 "New Year Treat", and then from episode 13 onwards it returned to the very beginning starting with Taskmaster Series 1 Episode 1, returned to "real-time" episodes during the broadcast run of series 11, 12 and NYT 2022 before returning to the older series after the newer series concluded.

A second official podcast, called Taskmaster: The People's Podcast, was launched in April 2022. It is hosted by Series 8 champion Lou Sanders and comedy writer Jack Bernhardt. The hosts chat with Taskmaster fans as well as with cast and crew members.

Reception

Critical reception 
Andrew Billen of The Times gave a five-star review of the show's first episode, "Melon Buffet", calling it "funny, revealing, and glorious" and comparing it to The Generation Game. In another review of the first episode, Filipa Jodelka of The Guardian described Taskmaster as a panel show with an "edgy parlour-game twist". Jodelka praised the "molten-hot banter" between contestants and Davies, and compared the arbitrary awarding of points to QI and Numberwang. Also reviewing "Melon Buffet", Ellen Jones of The Independent praised the show as entertaining despite its "informal and cheap-looking" style.

Wesley Mead of Den of Geek wrote a positive review in 2016, praising the show as the "crowning jewel" of original programming on Dave, and approving of the design of the tasks and the range of approaches that contestants demonstrate. Mead believed that the second series was an improvement on the first, but criticised that the first three series had only one female contestant apiece.

Awards and nominations

References

External links 
 
 
 
 
 
 

 
Television series produced at Pinewood Studios
Channel 4 game shows
English-language television shows
Television game shows with incorrect disambiguation